The Cheng Nan-jung Liberty Museum is a museum in Songshan District, Taipei, Taiwan. The museum is dedicated to the pro-democracy activist Cheng Nan-jung.

History
The museum was inaugurated in 1999, on Human Rights Day, in honor of Cheng Nan-jung's lifelong struggle for freedom. The museum was built on the site of Cheng Nan-jung's self-immolation on 7 April 1989, which was an act of protesting the government curbing of the freedom of speech.

Exhibitions
Original manuscripts and objects belonging to Cheng Nan-jung are housed in the museum. There are also several copies of magazines from the Freedom Era.

Transportation
The museum is accessible within walking distance northeast from Zhongshan Junior High School Station of Taipei Metro.

See also
 List of museums in Taiwan

References

External links
  

1999 establishments in Taiwan
Biographical museums in Taiwan
Human rights museums
Museums established in 1999
Museums in Taipei